Pauline of Württemberg (4 September 1800 – 10 March 1873) was a Queen consort of Württemberg by marriage to her first cousin King William I of Württemberg.

Early life

Pauline Therese was born in Riga, one of the five children of Duke Louis of Württemberg and his wife, Princess Henriette of Nassau-Weilburg. Her siblings included Maria Dorothea, Archduchess of Austria; Amelia, Duchess of Saxe-Hildburghausen; Elisabeth Alexandrine, Princess of Baden, and Duke Alexander of Württemberg himself the founder of the Teck branch of the family.

Her paternal grandparents were Frederick II Eugene, Duke of Württemberg, and Friederike Dorothea of Brandenburg-Schwedt. Her maternal grandparents were Charles Christian, Prince of Nassau-Weilburg, and Princess Carolina of Orange-Nassau, a daughter of William IV, Prince of Orange.

She was tutored by her governess, the known memoirist Alexandrine des Écherolles, who described her pupils in her memoirs.

Queen
On 15 April 1820 in Stuttgart, Pauline Therese married her first cousin King William I of Württemberg. Pauline thus became Queen consort of Württemberg. As his third wife, their marriage was unhappy, particularly because of the deep attachment William showed to his mistress, the actress Amalia Stubenrauch.

Nevertheless, they had three children including the future King Charles I.

Pauline also served as a stepmother to Marie and Sophie, future Queen Consort of the Netherlands; they were William's daughters from his second marriage to Grand Duchess Catherine Pavlovna of Russia. In a letter written to her friend Lady Malet, Queen Sophie would later write of the possibility of how her stepmother Queen Pauline and one of her daughters (Catherine or Augusta) would soon be taking refuge in the Netherlands, as a consequence of the events following the Revolutions of 1848 in the German states.

Queen dowager
William I died at Schloss Rosenstein in Stuttgart on 25 June 1864. Upon his death, their alienation became known to the public; Pauline was completely excluded from her inheritance in his will. She died at Stuttgart, nine years later, on 10 March 1873, having lived her last years in Switzerland. Pauline had been very popular, not only for the kindness she showed to her subjects but also for the devotion she showed to the poor. Upon her death, Württemberg inhabitants gave her name to many roads and places in Stuttgart, Esslingen, and Friolzheim.

Issue
 Catherine (1821–1898); married Prince Frederick of Württemberg and was mother to William II of Württemberg.
 Charles I of Württemberg (1823–1891); married Olga Nikolaevna of Russia and had no issue.
 Augusta (1826–1898); married Prince Hermann of Saxe-Weimar-Eisenach and had issue.

Ancestry

References

Sources
 The New International Encyclopedia. Daniel Coit Gilman, Harry Thurston Peck, and Frank Moore Colby (eds). New York: Dodd, Mead, and Company. 1909.
 Sophie of Württemberg. A Stranger in The Hague: The Letters of Queen Sophie of the Netherlands to Lady Malet, 1842-1877. S.W. Jackson and Hella Haasse (eds.). Duke University Press. 1989.

1800 births
1873 deaths
Nobility from Riga
Baltic-German people
Queens consort of Württemberg
Duchesses of Württemberg
Queen mothers